Zeko Burgess is a Bermudian cricketer. In August 2019, he was named in Bermuda's squad for the Regional Finals of the 2018–19 ICC T20 World Cup Americas Qualifier tournament. In November 2019, he was named in Bermuda's squad for the Cricket World Cup Challenge League B tournament in Oman. He made his List A debut, for Bermuda against Uganda, on 6 December 2019.

In October 2021, he was named in Bermuda's Twenty20 International (T20I) squad for the 2021 ICC Men's T20 World Cup Americas Qualifier tournament in Antigua. He made his T20I debut on 10 November 2021, for Bermuda against the Bahamas. In May 2022, he was named in Bermuda's side for the 2022 Uganda Cricket World Cup Challenge League B tournament.

References

External links
 

Year of birth missing (living people)
Living people
Bermudian cricketers
Bermuda Twenty20 International cricketers
Place of birth missing (living people)